Sugar is the second studio album by American band Tonic. Released on November 9, 1999 and produced by the band itself, the album's title shared the same name as the fifth track on the recording. The creative and collaborative process spanned several geographic locations including Austin, Texas, and a  mansion in New Orleans, Louisiana, where actual recording for the album was performed. "Knock Down Walls" and "You Wanted More" were charting singles released off the record, with the latter having first appeared on the soundtrack to the movie American Pie. With Kevin Shepard no longer part of the band, touring drummer Peter Maloney (of Dishwalla) played drums on the album. Music videos for the songs "You Wanted More" and "Mean to Me" were created as part of the album's promotion. Tonic appeared on the television shows Late Night with Conan O'Brien and The Martin Short Show in late 1999 as part of additional promotion. Sugar spent eight total weeks on the Billboard 200 chart, reaching a peak of number 81 in its first week of release.

Track listing

All songs by Emerson Hart except where noted.
 "Future Says Run" – 3:46
 "You Wanted More" (Hart, Jeff Russo, Dan Lavery) – 3:50
 "Knock Down Walls" (Hart, Russo) – 3:43
 "Mean to Me" – 4:11
 "Sugar" (Hart, Lavery, Russo) – 3:29
 "Jump Jimmy (Stronger Than Mine)" (Hart, Lavery) – 3:39
 "Queen" – 4:34
 "Waiting for the Light to Change" – 4:32 (strings arranged by David Campbell)
 "Waltz with Me" – 3:45
 "Sunflower" (Hart, Lavery) – 3:20
 "Drag Me Down" (Hart, Lavery, Russo) – 2:46
 "Top Falls Down" (Hart, Kevin Shepard, Russo) – 4:17
 "Love a Diamond" (Hart, Lavery, Russo) – 3:52

Personnel
Tonic
 Emerson Hart – vocals, guitar, slide, percussion
 Jeff Russo – lead and rhythm guitar, backing vocals, slide, percussion
 Dan Lavery – bass guitar, backing vocals, slide
 Pete Maloney – drums

Charts

References

1999 albums
Tonic (band) albums